Revenu Québec (formerly the Ministère du Revenu du Québec [English: Quebec Ministry of Revenue]) is the department of the government of the Province of Quebec, Canada that:

sees to the collection of income tax and consumption taxes, while ensuring that each person pays a fair share of the financing of public services;
administers the support-payment collection program (PAPA) in order to ensure that the support to which children and custodial parents are entitled is received on a regular basis;
administers taxation-related social programs, as well as any other tax-collection and redistribution program entrusted to it by the government; and
makes recommendations to the government concerning fiscal policy and programs.

Effective 2005, the Ministère du Revenu du Québec has been renamed Revenu Québec. Effective 2010, Revenu Québec has been reconstituted as Agence du Revenu du Québec.

External links
Revenu Québec Official Site

Quebec government departments and agencies
Quebec